The Colt Model 1905 Marine Corps was a .38 revolver issued by the United States Marine Corps during the period from 1905 to 1909. It is a variation of the Colt M1892 with a rounded grip frame.  A small number (less than 850) are known to have been issued under military contract.  These revolvers are marked on the butt with the appropriate USMC markings and are serial numbered 001 through at least 812.  A further 926 copies were made between 1905 and 1909 for the commercial (civilian) market, and these revolvers are serial numbered on the butt from 10001 through 10926.

See also 
 List of individual weapons of the U.S. Armed Forces

References

Further reading
 

Colt revolvers
Military revolvers
Revolvers of the United States
United States Marine Corps equipment